John A. Affleck is an American former college sports coach. He coached baseball, men's basketball, and men's golf at Binghamton University, in addition to serving as an instructor and administrator. Under him, Binghamton's men's golf program qualified for nine NCAA Tournaments, including one in Division I. He is the only professor of physical education in the State University of New York (SUNY) system to have received the Chancellor's Award for Teaching.

Coaching career

Baseball
Affleck began his coaching career as the head coach of Harpur College's baseball program. (Harpur became part of the State University of New York system at the start of the 1965–1966 academic year, and was renamed State University of New York at Binghamton, as a result.) Affleck coached the school's baseball program for nine seasons (1964–1972) and had an overall record of 46-56-1. SUNY Binghamton had its first 10-win season under Affleck when it went 10-6 in 1971.

Men's basketball
At the start of the 1972–1973 academic year, Affleck left the baseball program to become the head coach of SUNY Binghamton's men's basketball program. He was the program's head coach for 11 seasons (1972–1973 to 1982–1983). His career record was 100-158. His teams finished with a winning percentage above .500 in only three of his eleven seasons, and they never finished better than .500 in SUNYAC play.

Men's golf
In 1985, Affleck started a club men's golf program at SUNY Binghamton. Under him, men's golf became a varsity sport at the school for the start of the 1988–1989 season. (In 1992, SUNY Binghamton began referring to itself simply as Binghamton University, and the change was reflected in the school's athletic programs.) He served as Binghamton's head coach for 15 seasons (1988–1989 to 2002–2003), in which the team won 69 tournaments and qualified for nine NCAA Tournaments. In seven NCAA Division III tournament appearances (1992–1998), Binghamton's highest finish was fourth place in 1993. The Bearcats also appeared in one Division II and one Division I tournament, as Binghamton's athletic program moved to higher divisions of the NCAA. In the 1999 NCAA Division II Northern Regional, Binghamton finished 11th out of 15 teams. In the 2003 NCAA Division I East Regional, Binghamton finished 22nd out of 27 teams.

Affleck received individual recognition for his golf coaching career. He was named District Coach of the Year six times and the America East Conference Coach of the Year in 2003.

Head coaching record

Men's basketball
The following is a table of Affleck's yearly records as an NCAA head men's basketball coach.

Baseball
The following is a table of Affleck's yearly records as an NCAA head baseball coach.

Hall of fame inductions
Affleck was inducted into the Binghamton University Athletic Hall of Fame in 2003.

References

Living people
Binghamton Bearcats baseball coaches
Binghamton Bearcats men's basketball coaches
Binghamton University faculty
College golf coaches in the United States
Sportspeople from Niagara Falls, New York
Taylor University alumni
University of Michigan alumni
Year of birth missing (living people)